Imre Taveter (born 21 April 1967, in Keila) is a retired Estonian sailor who specialized in the Finn class.

He started sailing in the Optimist class in 1976 at Kalev Yacht Club, in the Pirita district of Tallinn. Taveter won U18 Youth Championships titles of Soviet Union in the Finn class in 1984 and in 1985. He won the European U21 Junior Championships title in the Finn class (Cesme, Turkey) in 1987. Taveter has won 9 Estonian Championships titles in the Finn class (1992, 1994, 1995, 1996, 1997, 1998, 1999, 2000, 2003).

He ended his career as a full time athlete in 1996. Since then he continued to practice sailing sport as an amateur.

He has been selected to compete for Estonia in two editions of the Olympic Games (2000 and 2004), and has trained on years 1999-2004 at Pärnu Yacht Club.

Taveter made his Olympic debut, as a 33-year-old yachtsman, at the 2000 Summer Olympics in Sydney, where he finished twenty-second in the Finn class with a grade of 102.

In 2001 he started as a co-founder and CEO a company Frontier Hockey OÜ producing sports equipment for ice hockey players.

At the 2004 Summer Olympics in Athens, Taveter had been offered an invitational place from the International Sailing Federation to compete on his second Estonian team in the men's Finn class. Taveter recorded a net grade of 221 to round out the fleet of twenty-five sailors in last place, trailing Italy's Michele Marchesini in the overall standings by a twenty-point margin.

References

External links
 
 
 
 ESBL Bio 

1967 births
Living people
Estonian male sailors (sport)
Olympic sailors of Estonia
Sailors at the 2000 Summer Olympics – Finn
Sailors at the 2004 Summer Olympics – Finn
People from Keila
Pärnu Yacht Club sailors